is a Japanese tokusatsu superhero television series. It was broadcast in 1974 on the Mainichi Broadcasting System and NET, now known as TV Asahi. It is the third entry in the Kamen Rider Series of tokusatsu shows. It starred Ryo Hayami in the title role.

Plot summary 
Robotics scientist Keitaro Jin and his son Keisuke become caught up in a campaign of terror by an evil organization known as "G.O.D.". They are attacked and the professor's technology gets stolen, but before Keitaro dies, he performs surgery on his son, using the last of his robotics technology to transform Keisuke into the “X-Rider.” To avenge his father's death and ensure the safety of the entire world, Keisuke uses this technology as he battles the monstrous minions of G.O.D.’s Japan branch.

Characters
: The son of Keitaro Jin, Keisuke suffered mortal injuries inflicted by G.O.D when they attacked the Jins. As a result, with his father's final breath, Keisuke was made into an advanced cyborg developed for marine exploration called a  named Kamen Rider X. Driven to avenge his father's death and save the world, X battles G.O.D..
: The mentor of the previous Kamen Riders.
: Keisuke's fiancée, Keitaro's assistant, and a G.O.D. member. She and her twin sister Kiriko are Interpol agents investigating G.O.D., Ryoko joining the organization to spy on it while allowing herself to be turned into a cyborg. But Ryoko is forced to expose herself while protecting a child from Strong Arms Atlas and is destroyed by the G.O.D. General soon after.
: Ryoko's twin sister who is an Interpol investigator. She died protecting Keisuke from Strong Arms Atlas' arrow.
: A student of Johoku University and Tobei's coffee shop worker.
: Chiko's friend and Tobei's coffee shop worker.
: Keisuke's father, a robotics genius who trained his son with the two having a strained relationship. Refusing to join G.O.D when his technology attracted their attention, Keitaro is fatally wounded and turned his dying son into a cyborg to save his life. Prior to his death, Keitaro copied his mind into a super computer within the Jin Station which he intended to help Keisuke through. But the Jin Station acted on Keitaro’s thought process to self destruct to keep Keisuke from being overly dependent on it.

G.O.D.

 : A mystery man who commands the G.O.D. operatives through taped messages placed in various objects that self-destruct upon relaying his instructions.
 : The Chief of Security of G.O.D., armed with the Geist Cutter shield and the Apollo Shot shogun, his human appearance wears a white tuxedo with black gloves until he invokes . He destroyed himself using his Arm Bomb after he was defeated by X's Finishing Kick.
 : Revived by two doctors of G.O.D. Armed with the Apollo Magnum bayonet on his right hand, the Geist Cutter shield, and the small Geist Cutter shield on his left shoulder. He was destroyed by X's X Kick.
 : The leader of G.O.D., he reveals himself after Apollo Geist's destruction, mocking X. He was destroyed by a self-destroying function that Dr. Noroi started.
 : Dr. Noroi is revealed to be the leader of the Government of Darkness. He was destroyed in King Dark's destruction after being stabbed by X's Ridol Whip.
 : Warriors who serve as foot soldiers for the Government of Darkness. Not only do they carry spears, they also wield pistols and machine guns.

Special guest stars
Hayato Ichimonji/Kamen Rider 2 from Kamen Rider
Shiro Kazami/Kamen Rider V3 from Kamen Rider V3

Episodes 
  (Original Airdate: February 16, 1974)
  (Original Airdate: February 23, 1974)
  (Original Airdate: March 2, 1974)
  (Original Airdate: March 9, 1974)
  (Original Airdate: March 16, 1974)
  (Original Airdate: March 23, 1974)
  (Original Airdate: March 30, 1974)
  (Original Airdate: April 6, 1974)
  (Original Airdate: April 13, 1974)
  (Original Airdate: April 20, 1974)
  (Original Airdate: April 27, 1974)
  (Original Airdate: May 4, 1974)
  (Original Airdate: May 11, 1974)
  (Original Airdate: May 18, 1974)
  (Original Airdate: May 25, 1974)
  (Original Airdate: June 1, 1974)
  (Original Airdate: June 8, 1974)
  (Original Airdate: June 15, 1974)
  (Original Airdate: June 22, 1974)
  (Original Airdate: June 29, 1974)
  (Original Airdate: July 6, 1974)
  (Original Airdate: July 13, 1974)
  (Original Airdate: July 20, 1974)
  (Original Airdate: July 27, 1974)
  (Original Airdate: August 3, 1974)
  (Original Airdate: August 10, 1974)
  (Original Airdate: August 17, 1974)
  (Original Airdate: August 24, 1974)
  (Original Airdate: August 31, 1974)
  (Original Airdate: September 7, 1974)
  (Original Airdate: September 14, 1974)
  (Original Airdate: September 21, 1974)
  (Original Airdate: September 28, 1974)
  (Original Airdate: October 5, 1974)
  (Original Airdate: October 12, 1974)

Movies
Kamen Rider X Reedited episode 3. A little girl named Sayoko witnesses the murder of an Interpol agent by the G.O.D. kaijin Hercules. Keisuke Jin saves her before Hercules disposes of her. Sayoko tells Keisuke that G.O.D. is targeting an important official named Kibara. Kamen Rider X has his hands full when G.O.D abducts Kibara and takes Sayoko and her mother hostage.

 During a motocross practice, Keisuke Jin is ambushed by two of G.O.D.'s kaijin warriors. He transforms into Kamen Rider X, but little does he know that his battle is recorded and analyzed by King Dark to create a super kaijin. Meanwhile, other G.O.D. kaijin are attacking children all over Tokyo. But before the other Riders intervene, the kaijin mysteriously disappear. Upon learning about King Dark's latest plans, Kamen Rider X joins forces with the four Riders to stop G.O.D. and their revived kaijin.

S.I.C. Hero Saga
The S.I.C. Hero Saga story for Kamen Rider X was published in Monthly Hobby Japan magazine in its July to September 2009 issues. The story was titled .

Chapter titles

Cast
Ryo Hayami as Keisuke Jin
Naoko Miyama as Ryoko Mizuki, Kiriko Mizuki
Jun Tazaki as Keitaro Jin
Akiji Kobayashi as Tōbei Tachibana
Chisako Kosaka as Chiko
Miyuki Hayata as Mako
Yasuhiko Uchida as Apollogeist
Osamu Saka as General of G.O.D. (voice)
Fumio Wada as King Dark/Dr. Noroi (voice)
Shinji Nakae as Narrator

Songs
Opening theme

Lyrics: Shotaro Ishinomori
Composition: Shunsuke Kikuchi
Artist: Ichirou Mizuki

Ending theme

Lyrics: Saburo Yatsude
Composition: Shunsuke Kikuchi
Artist: Ichirou Mizuki

References 

X
1974 Japanese television series debuts
1974 Japanese television series endings
TV Asahi original programming
1970s Japanese television series
Japanese horror fiction television series